"Say 'cheese is an English-language instruction used by photographers who want their subject or subjects to smile. By saying "cheese", most people form their mouths into what appears to be a smile-like shape.

History 
In the late 19th century, different aesthetic and behavioral norms required keeping the mouth small, which led to photographers using "say prunes".

In different languages and cultures
 
Perhaps because of strong Western influence, especially in the realm of photography, and perhaps because of increased numbers of Western visitors after photographic equipment became widely available, "Say cheese" has also entered into the Japanese language. However, "say" is almost always dropped from the phrase, resulting in simply being "Cheese." This is usually in Japanese (and written in katakana) as "chiizu" (チーズ).

Other languages have adopted this method, albeit with different words that sound similar to cheese to get the desired effect of shaping the mouth to form a smile.
Argentina: "whiskey" ("whiskey", pronounced to end with an ee sound.)
Bulgaria: "Zele" ("Cabbage")
Brazil: "Digam 'X ("Say 'X) (the name of the letter "X" in Portuguese (/ʃis/) sounds a lot like the English word "cheese").
China: 茄子 (Qiézi), meaning "eggplant". The pronunciation of this word is notably similar to that of the English word "cheese". In Hong Kong, the phrase is "一,二,三" ("yat yi saam") meaning "1, 2, 3."
Colombia: "whiskey" ("whiskey", pronounced to end with an ee sound.)
Croatia: "ptičica" ("little bird")
Czech Republic: "sýr" ("cheese")
Denmark: "Sig 'appelsin ("Say 'orange)
Finland: "Muikku", a species of fish known in English as the vendace.
France and other French-speaking countries: "ouistiti" ("marmoset")
Germany: Food-related words like "Spaghetti", "Käsekuchen" (cheesecake), or "Wurst" are used, mainly to make children laugh for the picture.
Hungary: "Itt repül a kis madár" ("Here flies the little bird") "cheese" is also used, mostly by younger people.
India: "paneer" (Hindi: पनीर) people also say hari
Italy: "dì cheese ("say 'cheese)
Morocco: "Khbiz" ("bread")
Iran: "سیب" (Saib), meaning "apple."
Israel: "תגידו צ'יז" (tagidu tshiz), meaning "say 'cheese.
Japan: "Sei, No..." ("Ready, Set..."). Also チーズ (chīzu), meaning "cheese", is used.
Korea: "kimchi"
Most Latin American countries: "Diga 'whiskey ("Say 'whiskey).
Netherlands: "Lach eens naar het vogeltje" ("Smile at the little bird"). The English word "cheese" is also often used.
Nigeria: Many photographers prompt the subjects of their photographs to say "cheese" at the count of three
Poland: "ser" ("cheese")
Portugal: "Olha o passarinho" ("Look at the little bird").
Russia: The English word "cheese", or sometimes the Russian word "сыр" (pronounced seer) which means "cheese". Also "Скажи изюм" (pronounced Skazhi izyum), meaning "Say raisins" (used as the title of a 1983 novel by Vasily Aksyonov).
Serbia: "птичица" ("Little bird") which sounds like pteecheetsa
Slovakia: "syr" ("cheese")
Spain: "di/decid patata"  ("say 'potato). Also, "mirar al pajarito" ("look at the birdie"), intended to make people look directly at the camera. In other regions, like Catalonia or Valencian Community: "Lluís" ("Lewis").
Sweden: "Säg 'omelett ("Say 'omelette)
Turkey: "Peynir" ("cheese")
Vietnam: "2... 3... Cười lên nào!" ("2... 3... Smile!"). And sometimes "i..i..i....''" (pronounced like the name of the letter "E" in English).

References

Photography